Henry James Porter (1810 – 19 December 1878) was an English first-class cricketer active 1842–43 who played for Nottinghamshire. He was born in Nottingham and died in Sheffield. He played in three first-class matches.

References

1810 births
1878 deaths
English cricketers
Nottinghamshire cricketers
Players of Nottinghamshire cricketers